Sabariah binti Saidan is a Malaysian politician and served as Pahang State Executive Councillor since December 2022. She is a Member of the Pahang State Legislative Assembly (MLA) for Guai since November 2022. She is a member of the United Malays National Organisation (UMNO), a component party of the BN coalition.

Election Results

Honours 
  :
  Knight Companion of the Order of the Crown of Pahang (DIMP) – Dato' (2016)

Notes

References 

Living people
People from Pahang
Malaysian people of Malay descent
Malaysian Muslims
United Malays National Organisation politicians
Members of the Pahang State Legislative Assembly
Pahang state executive councillors
21st-century Malaysian politicians
Year of birth missing (living people)